Amlaid Ua Domhnalláin (died 1177), Chief poet of Connacht.

Amlaid Ua Domhnalláin was a member of a bardic family, Ó Domhnalláin of Clan Breasil, Máenmaige in Ui Maine (now Ballydonnellan, County Galway).

Other such members of his family would include Flann Óc mac Séoan Ó Domhnalláin, Flann Óge Ó Domhnalláin, Mael Sechlainn Ó Domhnalláin, Pádhraic Ó Domhnalláin, Padraig Ó Domhnallain, Ainglioch Ó Dónalláin and Seosamh Ó Dónalláin.

The surname Donnellan remains fairly common in Galway.

External links
 http://www.ucc.ie/celt/published/T100005B/

References

 The Surnames of Ireland, Edward MacLysaght, 1978.

People from County Galway
Medieval Irish poets
1177 deaths
12th-century Irish poets
12th-century Irish writers
Year of birth unknown
Irish male poets